Fort Wayne Assembly is an automobile factory in Roanoke, Indiana. Opened in 1986 by General Motors, the  plant produces vehicles on the company's GMT T1XX vehicle platform. Facilities include 2 body shops, a paint shop, general assembly, and sequence center. It assumed operations of the former Pontiac Truck and Bus Assembly. Located at 12200 Lafayette Center Rd, Roanoke, IN 46783 (260) 673-2345.

Vehicles produced 
As of September 2022:
 Chevrolet Silverado
 GMC Sierra

References

External links
 

General Motors factories
Motor vehicle assembly plants in Indiana
Economy of Fort Wayne, Indiana
Buildings and structures in Fort Wayne, Indiana
1986 establishments in Indiana